So Alive may refer to:

 So Alive (Love and Rockets album), 1989
 "So Alive" (Love and Rockets song), 1989
 "So Alive" (Ryan Adams song), 2004
 "So Alive" (Skepta and N-Dubz song), 2011
 So Alive (EP), a 2008 EP by Kym Campbell
 So Alive, an EP by Gerard McMahon recording as G Tom Mac
 So Alive, an album by Ann Lee
 So Alive, an EP by The Product, 2012
 "So Alive", a song by Goo Goo Dolls from Boxes